Certified Interconnect Designer (CID) is a certification from the IPC Designer's Council for experienced PCB design professionals. CID+ is the advanced version of this certification.

External links
IPC Designers Council, Designer Certification – WAGO PCB Interconnect connector 2059 series  Click 

Printed circuit board manufacturing
Professional titles and certifications